David Singleton Doty (born June 30, 1929) is a senior United States district judge of the United States District Court for the District of Minnesota.

Education and career

Doty was born in Anoka, Minnesota. He received his Bachelor of Arts degree from the University of Minnesota in 1952 and his Juris Doctor from the University of Minnesota Law School in 1961. He had served as a captain in the United States Marine Corps in the interim, from 1952 to 1958. Following graduation he practiced privately in St. Paul, Minnesota for a year. He moved to Minneapolis the next year and practiced there from 1962 to 1987, partly with the Popham Haik law firm. He had also served as a state Special Assistant Attorney General from 1968 to 1969 and as President of the Minnesota State Bar Association from 1984 to 1985.

Federal judicial service

Doty was nominated by President Ronald Reagan on February 5, 1987, to a seat on the United States District Court for the District of Minnesota vacated by Judge Miles Lord. He was confirmed by the United States Senate on May 7, 1987, and received commission on May 8, 1987. He assumed senior status on June 30, 1998.

Notable case

Throughout his career as a judge, Doty has played an important role in labor disputes involving the National Football League (NFL).  Judge Doty is named in the current NFL collective bargaining agreement (CBA) as the ultimate arbiter of grievances or issues between the NFL Players Association and the NFL Management Council. On March 1, 2011, he ruled that the NFL violated the CBA by negotiating a $4 billion payment from their broadcasting partners, in effect purchasing insurance against a potential lockout.

References

Sources
 

1929 births
Living people
Judges of the United States District Court for the District of Minnesota
United States district court judges appointed by Ronald Reagan
20th-century American judges
People from Anoka, Minnesota
University of Minnesota Law School alumni
United States Marine Corps officers
21st-century American judges